Mohammed Naseehu Ali (born 1971) is a Ghanaian-born writer based in New York City.

Biography
Born in Kumasi, Ghana, Ali went to the United States in 1988 to study. He is a graduate of Interlochen Arts Academy and Bennington College.

His first book, a collection of short stories titled The Prophet of Zongo Street, was published in 2006 and received positive reviews. Ali has acknowledged being influenced in the writing of this book by V. S. Naipaul's Miguel Street. He has published short stories and non-fiction essays in several publications, including The New Yorker, the New York Times, Mississippi Review, BOMB, Gathering of the Tribes, and Essence. Ali now lives in Brooklyn, New York.

References

External links
 Mohammed Naseehu Ali, "'My Name Is Not Cool Anymore'", The New York Times, November 21, 2004.

Ghanaian writers
Ghanaian male writers
American short story writers
American essayists
American male essayists
Interlochen Center for the Arts alumni
Bennington College alumni
Living people
1971 births
People from Kumasi